Ponderomotive may refer to:

 Ponderomotive energy
 Ponderomotive force